Proximal subungual onychomycosis is an infection of the nail plate by fungus, primarily affecting the proximal nailfold.

See also 
 Onychomycosis
 Skin lesion

References 

Mycosis-related cutaneous conditions